5th Panzer Division may refer to:

 5th Panzer Division (Wehrmacht)
 5th Panzer Division (Bundeswehr)
 5th SS Panzer Division Wiking